Nucleariida is a group of amoebae with filose pseudopods, known mostly from soils and freshwater. They are distinguished from the superficially similar vampyrellids mainly by having mitochondria with discoid cristae, in the absence of superficial granules, and in the way they consume food.

Classification

Molecular studies indicate that nucleariids are closely related to fungi. and more distantly to the lineage that gave rise to choanoflagellates and metazoa opisthokonts, the group which includes animals, fungi. Some use a broad definition of Opisthokonta to include all of these organisms with flattened mitochondrial cristae.

The genera Rabdiophrys, Pinaciophora, and Pompholyxophrys, freshwater forms with hollow siliceous scales or spines, were included in Nucleariida by some. This was disputed by Smith and Chao who placed them in the Rhizaria.  Their affinity with the nucleariids has been confirmed. Historically, nucleariids were included among the heliozoa as the Rotosphaerida because both they and heliozoa had ropunded bodies and radiating pseudopodia.

According to a 2009 paper, Fonticula, a cellular slime mold, is an opisthokont and more closely related to Nuclearia than to fungi.

Characteristics
Nucleariids (Nuclearia and Micronuclearia) are usually small, up to about 50 μm in size.

References

Opisthokont orders